Guy Mishpati (born 21 June 1990) is an Israeli football center defender. He currently plays for Maccabi Jaffa.

External links 
 

1990 births
Israeli Jews
Living people
Israeli footballers
Hapoel Rishon LeZion F.C. players
Hapoel Petah Tikva F.C. players
Hakoah Maccabi Amidar Ramat Gan F.C. players
Hapoel Jerusalem F.C. players
Hapoel Nir Ramat HaSharon F.C. players
Hapoel Ironi Baqa al-Gharbiyye F.C. players
Maccabi Yavne F.C. players
Hapoel Marmorek F.C. players
Hapoel Haifa F.C. players
Maccabi Jaffa F.C. players
Liga Leumit players
Israeli Premier League players
Footballers from Rishon LeZion
Association football central defenders